The 2017 KNSB Dutch Single Distance Championships were held at the Thialf ice skating rink in Heerenveen from Wednesday 28 December 2016 to Friday 30 December 2016. Although the tournament was held in 2016 it was the 2017 edition as it was part of the 2016–2017 speed skating season.

Schedule

Medalists

Men

Women

Source:

References

External links
 KNSB

Dutch Single Distance Championships
Single Distance Championships
2017 Single Distance
KNSB Dutch Single Distance Championships, 2017